Yours for the Asking is a 1936 American comedy film film starring George Raft as a casino owner and Dolores Costello as the socialite he hires as hostess.  The movie also features Ida Lupino and was directed by Alexander Hall.

Plot
Johnny Lamb runs a secret casino in Miami. He meets impoverished socialite Lucille Sutton and decides to open a casino at her mansion. His friends worry Lucille will ruin Johnny so they hire con artists Gertie Malloy and Dictionary McKinney to impersonate socialites to seduce Johnny. Johnny falls for Gertie and asks for Lucille's help in wooing her.

Cast
 George Raft as Johnny Lamb
 Dolores Costello as Lucille Sutton
 Ida Lupino as Gert Malloy
 Reginald Owen as Dictionary McKinney
 James Gleason as Saratoga
 Edgar Kennedy as Bicarbonate
 Lynne Overman as Honeysuckle
 Robert Gleckler as Slick Doran
 Groucho Marx as Sunbather (uncredited)
 Dennis O'Keefe as Man (uncredited)
 Charles Ruggles as Sunbather (uncredited)
 Ellen Drew as Girl (uncredited)
 Thomas A. Curran as Man (uncredited)

Production
The film was known as The Duchess. Paramount announced it in October 1935 with Raft attached from the beginning. He was to make it after It Had to Happen which he did at Fox. The title was changed to Yours for the Asking in April 1936.

Groucho Marx, Charles Ruggles and Tookie Spreckles appeared as extras when the film shot some footage on Coronado Island at Hotel del Coronado.

Reception
The film made a small profit.

References

External links 
 
 

1936 films
1936 romantic comedy films
American romantic comedy films
American black-and-white films
Films directed by Alexander Hall
American films about gambling
Paramount Pictures films
1930s American films
Films set in Miami
Films shot in San Diego